The Lynk & Co 01 is a compact crossover SUV produced by Geely and marketed through the Lynk & Co marque. It is the first model announced by Lynk & Co. The model has been developed in conjunction with Volvo Cars, also owned by Geely.

History
Lynk & Co 01 was formerly codenamed Geely CX11 during its decelopment. First revealed online in October 2016, it went on sale on August 4, 2017. The PHEV version went out for the market on 7 July 2018, as the very first luxury hybrid SUV produced by Lynk & Co. The electric recharge mileage of it reaches 51 kilometers.

The Lynk & Co 01 is equipped with a 10.2-inch multimedia screen. One of the "Pro" models provides with timely four-wheel drive. The Speech Recognition System is able to take part in media, navigation system, phone and air conditioning.

Model details

The Lynk & Co 01 is based on the Compact Modular Architecture platform, which also underpins the Volvo XC40. The 01 will share much of its components with the XC40, including its electrical architecture, engines and safety systems.

The car is controlled by a shared digital key that can allow owners to provide access to other Lynk & Co cars. Engines are mated to a manual gearbox or seven-speed automatic.

Lynk & Co 01 received 5.5-stars rating in C-NCAP crash test. The overall rating reaches 60.1 points.

2021 MY facelift
A facelift was launched for the 2021 model year and the launch of the European market. For the European market, there will be no trim levels with the Lynk & Co 01 with the only options being the powertrain and paint color. Standard equipment for the 01 offered in Europe includes a large central touchscreen, sat-nav, a social media camera, and over-the-air updates for the in-car tech systems.

The Lynk & Co 01 was launched in Kuwait on November 2021 with two trim levels "Hyper" and "Hyper Pro". One 2.0 the powertrain is available, 2.0L B4204T30 Drive-E-T4 with 218hp/160Kw and an 8-speed FWD automatic transmission, no hybrid drivetrain. Furthermore, colour options are White, Black and Red.

2022 MY facelift
The 01 received a facelift for the 2022 model year and newly introduced 01 hybrid versions with up to 245hp was also introduced. The 01 hybrid versions is available as EM-F and EM-P versions. The 01 EM-F and EM-P features a new hybrid powertrain called the LYNK E-MOTIVE. It is based on Geely’s Hi-X hybrid system. The YNK E-MOTIVE uses a 1.5-liter three-cylinder petrol engine (DHE15-ESZ) for 110 kW (150 hp) mated to a three-speed DHT Pro hybrid gearbox. The thermal efficiency of the engine reaches 43.32% and can reduce fuel consumption by up to 40% and the vehicle has an efficient fuel consumption of 4.88 L/100km (WLTC). The EM-F is a HEV (Hybrid Electric Vehicle) and the EM-P is a PHEV (Plug-in Hybrid EV).

Sales
Sales in China started in 2017.

Lynk & Co delivered the first vehicles in Europe in spring 2021. The hybrid 01, which shares the platform with the Volvo XC40 is the first model to be available. A subscription membership model was also launched in Europe. Only the HEV and PHEV versions are offered in Europe, but not the gasoline variant.

References

C-NCAP small off-road
Cars of China
01
First car made by manufacturer
Cars introduced in 2017